Jason Kearns is an American lawyer and government official, currently serving as Chair of the United States International Trade Commission.

Before his appointment to the Commission, Kearns served as chief international trade counsel to the United States House Committee on Ways and Means. Kearns previously served in the Office of the General Counsel to the U.S. Trade Representative and worked in the international trade group of the law firm WilmerHale.

Kearns was originally nominated to serve on the United States International Trade Commission by outgoing President Barack Obama in January 2017. After President Obama left office, Kearns' nomination was withdrawn and then resubmitted by President Trump.

References

External links
 Biography at University of Pennsylvania

Living people
University of Denver alumni
Harvard University alumni
University of Pennsylvania Law School alumni
21st-century American lawyers
Trump administration personnel
International Trade Commission personnel
Wilmer Cutler Pickering Hale and Dorr people
Year of birth missing (living people)